Captain Lewis Robertson (4 August 1883 – 3 November 1914) was a Scottish rugby union player. He also played for the Army from 1904 to 1914, and several other clubs.

After leaving school, he attended RMC Sandhurst and, passing out with honours, he joined the Queen's Own Cameron Highlanders in 1903. He was killed in World War I from wounds received in action at Ypres. He is buried at the Ypres Reservoir Cemetery.

Early life
Lewis Robertson was born on 4 August 1883, the third son of James, a wine merchant, and Agnes Rae Robertson of Edinburgh. His siblings were Agnes, William, James, Katherine, Jessie, and Frances. He attended Cargilfield Preparatory School, and Fettes College, and then went on to RMC Sandhurst.

Rugby Union career

Amateur career

Robertson played rugby for Fettesian-Lorettonian, London Scottish, Monkstown, Edinburgh Wanderers, and United Services Portsmouth. He also represented RMC Sandhurst against RMA Sandhurst in 1902, and the Army in the annual match against the Navy from 1909 to 1914. In the last year, he was captain of the Army XV but he voluntarily offered to relinquish his position because he deemed himself out of form and unworthy of it, according to an article published after his death in Windsor Magazine.

Provincial career

He played for Edinburgh District against Glasgow District in the 1910 inter-city match, while with Edinburgh Wanderers. Edinburgh District won the match 26–5.

He played for the Whites Trial side against the Blues Trial side on 21 January 1911, while with London Scottish. He scored a drop goal in a 26–19 win for the Whites.

International career

The first was against  in March 1908, and three years passed before he was selected a second time, for the match against  in February 1911. The following year, 1912, he played in every game for Scotland (except the France match), including the one against the South African side on tour of the Home Nations. He was selected for the France match but did not play due to a family bereavement. In 1913, he played in the three matches against the Home Nations, his last against England in a close-fought match at Twickenham, which the home side won by one try to nil.

International appearances

Military career

Robertson passed out of RMC Sandhurst with honours, and joined the 1st Battalion Queen's Own Cameron Highlanders as Second Lieutenant on 22 April 1903. His regiment transferred to Dublin in 1905. He was promoted to Lieutenant effective 11 March 1909. In January 1911, he was appointed an Assistant Superintendent of Gymnasia. At the outbreak of the First World War, Robertson was recalled to the depot in Inverness, and was then briefly at Aldershot before his regiment crossed to France in September 1914 to fight on the Aisne. On 2 November 1914, Robertson was in the trenches at Ypres, when he was wounded in the arm. After having the wound dressed, he returned to his company and was wounded a second time, more seriously, and he died the following day.

He is buried at the Ypres Reservoir Commonwealth War Graves Commission Cemetery (Grave II. A. 4.).

See also
 List of international rugby union players killed in World War I

References

Bibliography

Further reading
 
 Obituary

1883 births
1914 deaths
People educated at Cargilfield School
People educated at Fettes College
Fettesian-Lorretonian rugby union players
Scottish rugby union players
Scotland international rugby union players
British military personnel killed in World War I
Queen's Own Cameron Highlanders officers
British Army personnel of World War I
Graduates of the Royal Military College, Sandhurst
Edinburgh District (rugby union) players
United Services players
London Scottish F.C. players
Monkstown Football Club players
Whites Trial players
Edinburgh Wanderers RFC players
Rugby union players from Edinburgh
Military personnel from Edinburgh